The Campbell and Kelly Building, at Corona and Main Sts. in Tonopah, Nevada, is a historic building built c. 1912.  It was listed on the National Register of Historic Places in 1982.

It was deemed significant for its commercial architecture as "a fine example of metal clad commercial construction with the original store fronts and other detailing still intact", and for its association with leading citizens H. P. Campbell and Rube Kelly, who developed machine works and foundry operations in Tonopah.  This building was bought by them in 1915 to expand their automobile sales and service business.

References 

Tonopah, Nevada
Buildings and structures in Nye County, Nevada
Commercial buildings completed in 1912
Commercial buildings on the National Register of Historic Places in Nevada
National Register of Historic Places in Tonopah, Nevada
1912 establishments in Nevada